Ballajá, located in Old San Juan, is one of 7 subbarrios of San Juan Antiguo barrio in the municipality of San Juan in Puerto Rico.

History
This subdistrict is named after the historic Ballajá Barracks, which now house the Museum of the Americas. El Morro is also located in this subdistrict.

Puerto Rico was ceded by Spain in the aftermath of the Spanish–American War under the terms of the Treaty of Paris of 1898 and became an unincorporated territory of the United States. In 1899, the United States Department of War conducted a census of Puerto Rico finding that the population of Ballajá was 1,217.

Gallery

References

External links
 
 Video of the Ballajá barracks in 2020

Old San Juan, Puerto Rico
Geography of San Juan, Puerto Rico